Grontardo is a comune (municipality) in the Province of Cremona in the Italian region Lombardy, located about  southeast of Milan and about  northeast of Cremona.

The town has a parish church dedicated to San Basilio.

Grontardo borders the following municipalities: Corte de' Frati, Gabbioneta-Binanuova, Gadesco-Pieve Delmona, Persico Dosimo, Pescarolo ed Uniti, Scandolara Ripa d'Oglio, Vescovato.

References

Cities and towns in Lombardy